Liga ASOBAL 2008–09 season (known as the SabadellAtlántico ASOBAL for sponsorship reasons) is the 19th since its establishment. Ciudad Real are the defending champions, having won their 3rd La Liga title in the previous season. The campaign began on Saturday, 13 September 2008. The league is originally scheduled to end on 16 May 2009. A total of 16 teams contest the league, 14 of which have already contested in the 2007–08 season, and two of which have been promoted from the División de Honor B. In addition, a new match ball - the SELECT Super Five- is serving as the official ball for all matches.

Promotion and relegation 
Teams promoted from 2007–08 División de Honor B de Balonmano
 Alcobendas
 Cuenca 2016

Teams relegated to 2007–08 División de Honor B de Balonmano
 Teka Cantabria
 Algeciras

Team information 

Last updated: 10 May 2009

League table

Teams by autonomous community

Top goal scorers

As day 30 of 30

Top goalkeepers

As day 30 of 30

References 

Liga ASOBAL seasons
1
Spain